Mehdiabad-e Yek (also Romanized as Mehdīābād-e Yek) is a village in Sharifabad Rural District, in the Central District of Sirjan County, Kerman Province, Iran. At the 2006 census, its population was 69, in 20 families.

References 

Populated places in Sirjan County